This article is a list of Los Angeles Dodgers owners and executives.

Owners

Chairmen

Presidents

General Managers
The Dodgers did not employ a General Manager until 1950. Before then, the team President had the duties commonly associated with the GM. There was also no general manager between 2018-2021, as the President of Baseball Operations took GM duties during this period.

Executive Office personnel

Baseball Operations personnel

References

Los Angeles Dodgers
 
 
Owners and executives